1-800-Flowers.com, Inc. is a floral and foods gift retailer and distribution company in the United States. The company's focus, except for Mother's Day and Valentine's Day, is on gift baskets. They also use the name 1-800-Baskets.com. Their use of "coyly self-descriptive telephone numbers" is part of founder James McCann's business model.

History

Founding and early years
The concept of using the word "flowers" within a phoneword was originated by William Alexander in the early 1980s. The phone number, 1-800-356-9377, had been randomly assigned to a trucking brokerage in Wisconsin owned by Curtis Jahn and was used for that company until 1981. In an agreement with Jahn that would later be sharply contested, Granville Semmes and David Snow formed a Louisiana corporation that began to use that number to sell flowers in Louisiana, starting in 1982. The use of the number would trigger a series of lawsuits. Their business struggled and that company was dissolved, with its assets going to investors James Poage and John Davis of Texas. The new corporation struggled financially as well. Its assets were acquired in 1986 by McCann, an owner of several flower shops in the New York City area since 1976, under whom the business saw success and growth.

In 1994, the company bought Conroy's Flowers. The 1800flowers.com domain name was registered on September 1, 1995.

In May 2006, Alpine Confections Inc. brands including Fannie May Confections, Fannie Farmer and Harry London Candies were purchased for $85 million. 

In September 2007, it announced a partnership with Martha Stewart Living Omnimedia to produce a line of floral products inspired by Martha Stewart.

According to the Consumerist in 2008, customers have reported unknowingly being subscribed to LiveWell after receiving rebate checks from 1-800-Flowers.

It had 4000 employees as of 2008, with a market cap of US$119 million.

In 2009, revenue was US$714 million.  Operating income was US$72.2 million, net income was US$98.4 million, assets were valued at US$286 million, and equity was at 134 million.

In March 2017, Fannie May and Harry London were sold to Ferrero SpA for $115 million.

Acquisitions
 March 2005, Cheryl's Cookies
 May 2006, Alpine Confections Inc. brands including Fannie May Confections, Fannie Farmer and Harry London Candies
 April 1, 2008, DesignPac Gifts LLC.
 July 21, 2008, Napco Marketing Corporation.
 August 1, 2011, Flowerama.
 August 5, 2019, Shari's Berries
 August 3, 2020, Personalization Mall
 October 28, 2021, Vital Choice
 January 14, 2022, Alice Table

Locations
 One Old Country Road, Carle Place NY 11514 - ended in 2021
 2 Jericho Plaza, Jericho, NY 11753
 After a five-year search, 1-800-Flowers.com has found a new home in Jericho. The company has leased 96,867 square feet of office space at Two Jericho Plaza.

See also
 Vanity numbers
 Phonewords

References

External links
 
 Reports on Alleged Fraud by 1-800-Flowers.com

Carle Place, New York
Retail companies established in 1982
Companies listed on the Nasdaq
Florist companies
Online retailers of the United States
Telephone numbers in the United States
Companies based in Nassau County, New York
1982 establishments in Louisiana
1999 initial public offerings